Coenie de Villiers (Coenraad Grabe de Villiers), born 11 October 1956, is a South African singer-songwriter, pianist, pop artist who sings in his mother tongue, Afrikaans. If any comparison was required, Coenie's music is best compared to the pop/rock of Herbert Groenemeyer (German language) or Billy Joel (USA English language).

Early life
Born in Bloemfontein, South Africa, Coenie was educated at University of the Free State majoring in media studies where he later on lectured in the Communications faculty.  He has always viewed his musical career as his second vocation. He is also a classically trained pianist.

1980s
During the late 1980s, Coenie spent a few years in self-imposed exile in Cyprus.  Coenie has also performed in New Zealand, Canada, the Netherlands, Belgium, and the United Kingdom

Coenie lived on the island of Cyprus during the eighties and nineties. He wrote, recorded and produced the album Amper Alleen in Cyprus and in Athens, Greece. Amper Alleen was the second SA album to be released on CD.

Coenie and his family returned to South Africa after the release of Nelson Mandela and the unbanning of the ANC. He released Hartland, an album which included a vocal performance by Lesley Rae Dowling.

Coenie signed with Mountain Records in 1983, and recorded his debut album, Skoppensboer, working with producer, Patrick Lee-Thorp and engineer, Kevin Shirley, in the same year. He subsequently recorded 4 albums for the label many of which won industry awards. In addition he contributed to label compilations of his work. Since leaving Mountain Records he has recorded a number of one off projects for different labels.

Personal life
He is Manager of a Marketing Company in Gauteng and has also spent time as a radio DJ, TV presenter and advertising executive. He is currently a presenter for the TV show "Kwêla" on DStv's KykNET channel.

Discography
 Skoppensboer (Mountain Records beginning 2003, rereleased)
 Die Reisiger
 Kruispaaie
 Amper Alleen (Cyprus)
 Hartland
 Karoo Nagte (1990)
 Liefdesversies
 Ek Wens
 Hooglied
 Solo
 Zen
 Handgemaak (unplugged)(SAMA Award, Huisgenoot TEMPO Award)
 Weerlig oor die See (2008)
 Dekade (2009)
 Hart van Glas (2011)
 Emoji
 Pure Coenie
 ' ' Coenie 2.2"

References

External links
 
 
 
 the sixth sense Coenie De Villiers

1956 births
Living people
20th-century South African male singers
University of the Free State alumni
People from Bloemfontein